Gardiner is a unincorporated community in Park County, Montana, United States, along the 45th parallel.  As of the 2020 census, the population of the community and nearby areas was 833.

Gardiner was officially founded in 1880. The area has served as a main entrance to Yellowstone National Park since its creation in 1872. Yellowstone National Park Heritage and Research Center, which opened May 18, 2005, is located in Gardiner and houses National Park Service archives, Yellowstone museum collections and reference libraries.

Gardiner was impacted by the 2022 Montana floods.

History
The name Gardiner derives from Johnson Gardner, a fur trapper who operated in the area in 1830–31. He named the lush headwaters valley of today's Gardner River Gardner's Hole. Originally, named Gardner's Fork, the river took on Gardner's name although prospectors and explorers who visited the area later in the century were unaware of the trapper Johnson Gardner. In 1870, when the Washburn–Langford–Doane Expedition passed through the area they began calling the river Gardiner, a phonetic error. Hiram M. Chittenden (1895) and Nathaniel P. Langford (1905) confirmed this spelling in their accounts of the expedition.

These entrepreneurs eventually established a primitive hotel at Mammoth and were not evicted from the area until many years after the park was established. McCartney also went by the name Jim Gardiner and received messages, consignments and such destined for guests of his hotel addressed to: Jim on the Gardiner. On February 9, 1880, a territorial post office was established just outside the park boundary and Gardiner, Montana began.

In 1883, the Northern Pacific Railway completed the extension of their Park Branch Line from Livingston, Montana to Cinnabar north of Gardiner. In 1903, the line was extended to Gardiner. Railway service at Gardiner station was discontinued in 1948.

Geography
Gardiner is located at  (45.036837, -110.713768).

Climate

According to the Köppen Climate Classification system, Gardiner has a cold semi-arid climate, abbreviated "BSk" on climate maps.

Demographics

For statistical purposes, the United States Census Bureau has defined Gardiner as a census-designated place (CDP).

As of the census of 2000, there were 851 people, 435 households, and 210 families residing in the CDP. The population density was 224.9 people per square mile (86.9/km2). There were 497 housing units at an average density of 131.3 per square mile (50.8/km2). The racial makeup of the CDP was 97.30% White, 0.35% African American, 1.41% Native American, 0.24% Asian, 0.12% from other races, and 0.59% from two or more races. Hispanic or Latino of any race were 0.47% of the population.

There were 435 households, of which 22.1% had children under the age of 18 living with them, 40.0% were married couples living together, 5.7% had a female householder with no husband present, and 51.5% were non-families. 43.2% of all households were made up of individuals, and 4.8% had someone living alone who was 65 years of age or older. The average household size was 1.96 people and the average family size 2.73.

In the CDP, the age of the population was spread out, with 20.8% under the age of 18, 2.9% from 18 to 24, 40.5% from 25 to 44, 28.0% from 45 to 64, and 7.8% who were 65 years of age or older. The median age was 39 years. For every 100 females, there were 96.5 males. For every 100 females age 18 and over, there were 99.4 males.

The median income for a household in the CDP was $30,125, and the median income for a family was $46,071. Males had a median income of $30,240 versus $17,614 for females. The per capita income for the CDP was $17,810. About 3.4% of families and 8.2% of the population were below the poverty line, including 4.8% of those under age 18 and none of those age 65 or over.

Education
Gardiner Public Schools has a single educational building. Its divisions:
Gardiner School (Grades K-6; 101 students)
Gardiner 7-8 School (Grades 7-8; 44 students)
Gardiner High School (Grades 9-12; 85 students)

Infrastructure
Gardiner Airport is a public use airport located two miles (3.7 km) northwest of town.

Media

Gallery

See also
Angling in Yellowstone National Park
The Summit Lighthouse - international headquarters located in Gardiner
North Entrance Road Historic District

References

External links

Census-designated places in Park County, Montana
Census-designated places in Montana
1880 establishments in Montana Territory